United States Ambassador to the Congo may refer to:

United States Ambassador to the Democratic Republic of the Congo (Congo-Kinshasa) 
United States Ambassador to the Republic of the Congo (Congo-Brazzaville)